S. natalensis may refer to:
 Sevenia natalensis, the Natal tree nymph, a butterfly species found in southeastern Africa
 Streptomyces natalensis, a bacterium species